The 8th NKP Salve Challenger Trophy was an Indian domestic cricket tournament that was held in Bangalore from 10 January to 13 January 2002. The series involved the domestic and national players from India who were allocated in India Seniors, India A, and India B. India A defeated India Seniors by 8 wickets in the final to become the champions of the tournament.

Squads

Points Table

Matches

Group stage

Final

References

Indian domestic cricket competitions